Rungkit Wor.Sanprapai (born January 20, 2002) is a Thai Muay Thai fighter.

Biography

Rungkit started training in Muay Thai at the age of 7 after seeing others kids training near his hometown of Ranong. He quickly gained recognition and began fighting in the Bangkok stadiums at age 12.

In 2018, Rungkit had a high number of victories at Rajadamnern Stadium and was granted a title shot for the vacant 130 lbs belt,  in which he won against Rodtang Jitmuangnon at only 16 years old. As a result of his remarkable victories during that year, Rungkit was the runner-up for the Sports Authority of Thailand Fighter of the year Award.

In 2019, he took part in the Rise World Series kickboxing tournament.

On March 10, 2019, he defeated Fred Cordeiro by unanimous decision in the First Round of the Rise World Series.

On July 21, 2019, Rungkit was eliminated by Shiro in the semi-finals after a very close fight which went to an extra round and saw Rungkit lose by split decision.

Rungkit vacated his 130lbs Rajadamnern title shortly before his Rise World series semi final stating that he wouldn't be able to make that weight in a near future.

Titles and accomplishments
Professional Boxing Association of Thailand (PAT) 
 2016 Thailand 118 lbs Champion
 True4U Petchyindee 
 2017 CP Muaymanwansuk Tournament 120lbs Champion
 2017 True4U 120 lbs Champion
 2022 True4U 140 lbs Champion
 Rajadamnern Stadium 
 2018 Rajadamnern Stadium 130 lbs Champion
 2018 Rajadamnern Stadium Fighter of the Year

Fight record

|-  style="background:#fbb"
| 2022-12-17|| Loss ||align=left| Yodlekphet Or.Atchariya || Sinbi Stadium || Phuket, Thailand || KO (Low kicks) ||3  || 

|-  style="background:#fbb;"
| 2022-11-25|| Loss ||align=left| Thaksinlek D.N.Muaythai || Muaymanwansuk, Rangsit Stadium ||Pathum Thani, Thailand || Decision || 5||3:00
|-
! style=background:white colspan=9 |

|-  style="background:#fbb"
| 2022-10-28||Loss ||align=left| Yodlekphet Or.Atchariya || Rajadamnern World Series || Bangkok, Thailand || Decision (Unanimous) || 3 || 3:00 

|-  style="background:#fbb;"
| 2022-09-21 || Loss||align=left| Chujaroen Dabransarakarm ||Sinbi Muay Thai Birthday show + 789Tiger, Bangla Stadium || Phuket, Thailand ||Decision || 5 ||3:00
|-  style="background:#cfc;"
| 2022-08-11|| Win ||align=left| Thaksinlek D.N.Muaythai || Petchyindee, Rajadamnern Stadium ||Bangkok, Thailand || Decision || 5|| 3:00
|-  style="background:#cfc;"
| 2022-07-05||Win||align=left| Chatpetch SorJor.TongPrachin|| Muaymansananmuang, Rangsit Stadium|| Rangsit, Thailand || KO (Right hook)|| 3||
|- 
! style=background:white colspan=9 |
|-  style="background:#fbb;"
| 2022-05-12 || Loss ||align=left| Superball Tded99 ||Petchyindee, Rajadamnern Stadium || Bangkok, Thailand ||  Decision  || 5 || 3:00
|-  style="background:#fbb;"
| 2022-03-25||Loss  ||align=left| Flukenoi Kiatfahlikit|| Muaymanwansuk, Rajadamnern Stadium || Bangkok, Thailand || Decision|| 5 ||3:00
|- 
! style=background:white colspan=9 |
|-  style="background:#fbb;"
| 2022-02-17|| Loss ||align=left| Thaksinlek D.N.Muaythai|| Petchyindee, Rajadamnern Stadium || Bangkok, Thailand || Decision || 5 ||3:00 
|-  style="background:#fbb;"
| 2021-12-30|| Loss||align=left| Superball Teeded99 ||Muay Thai SAT Super Fight WiteetinThai || Phuket, Thailand || Decision|| 5 ||3:00 
|-  style="background:#cfc;"
| 2021-11-12|| Win ||align=left| Thaksinlek Kiatniwat ||Muaymanwansuk || Thailand || Decision || 5 || 3:00
|-  style="background:#fbb;"
| 2021-04-08|| Loss ||align=left| Superlek Kiatmuu9 || SuekMahakamMuayRuamPonKon Chana + Petchyindee|| Songkhla province, Thailand || Decision || 5 || 3:00
|-  style="background:#cfc;"
| 2021-03-12|| Win ||align=left| Sangmanee Sor Tienpo|| True4U Muaymanwansuk, Rangsit Stadium || Rangsit, Thailand || Decision || 5 || 3:00
|-  style="background:#c5d2ea;"
| 2020-12-04|| Draw ||align=left| Chujaroen Dabransarakarm ||Muaymanwansuk, Rangsit Stadium || Rangsit, Thailand || Decision || 5 || 3:00
|-  style="background:#FFBBBB;"
| 2020-11-05|| Loss||align=left| Sangmanee Sor Tienpo ||True4U Muaymanwansuk, Rangsit Stadium || Rangsit, Thailand || Decision || 5 || 3:00
|-  style="background:#cfc"
| 2020-09-10|| Win ||align=left| Yodlekpet Or. Pitisak || Sor.Sommai Birthday, Rajadamnern Stadium || Bangkok, Thailand || Decision || 5 || 3:00
|-  style="background:#cfc"
| 2020-07-17 || Win ||align=left| Kaewkangwan Priwayo ||True4U Muaymanwansuk, Rangsit Stadium || Rangsit, Thailand || Decision || 5 || 3:00
|-  style="background:#fbb"
| 2020-02-28 ||Loss ||align=left| Phet Utong Or. Kwanmuang  || Ruamponkonchon Pratan Super Fight || Pathum Thani, Thailand ||  Decision || 5 || 3:00
|-  style="background:#cfc;"
| 2019-12-23 || Win ||align=left| Saeksan Or. Kwanmuang || Rajadamnern Stadium || Bangkok, Thailand || Decision (Unanimous)|| 5 || 3:00
|-  style="background:#cfc;"
| 2019-11-21 || Win ||align=left| Mongkolpetch Petchyindee || Rajadamnern Stadium || Bangkok, Thailand || Decision || 5 || 3:00
|-  style="background:#fbb;"
| 2019-10-05||Loss||align=left| Suakim PK Saenchaimuaythaigym || Yod Muay Thai Naikhanomton || Buriram, Thailand || Decision|| 5 || 3:00
|-  style="background:#fbb;"
| 2019-09-05 || Loss ||align=left| Superlek Kiatmuu9 || Rajadamnern Stadium || Bangkok, Thailand || Decision || 5 || 3:00
|-  style="background:#fbb;"
| 2019-07-21 || Loss ||align=left| Shiro || Rise World Series 2019 Semi Finals || Osaka, Japan || Ex.R Decision (Split) || 4 || 3:00
|-  style="background:#cfc;"
| 2019-05-29 || Win ||align=left| Phet Utong Or. Kwanmuang || Rajadamnern Stadium || Bangkok, Thailand || KO (Low Kick)|| 3 ||
|-  style="background:#fbb;"
| 2019-04-04 || Loss ||align=left| Superlek Kiatmuu9 || Rajadamnern Stadium || Bangkok, Thailand || Decision || 5 || 3:00
|-  style="background:#cfc;"
| 2019-03-10 || Win ||align=left| Frederico Cordeiro || Rise World Series 2019 First Round || Tokyo, Japan || Decision (Unanimous) || 3 || 3:00
|-  style="background:#cfc;"
| 2019-02-01 || Win ||align=left| Suakim PK Saenchaimuaythaigym || Lumpinee Stadium || Bangkok, Thailand || Decision || 5 || 3:00
|-  style="background:#fbb;"
| 2018-12-26 || Loss ||align=left| Suakim PK Saenchaimuaythaigym || Rajadamnern Stadium || Bangkok, Thailand || Decision || 5 || 3:00
|-  style="background:#cfc;"
| 2018-11-22 || Win ||align=left| Petchdam Petchyindee Academy || Rajadamnern Stadium || Bangkok, Thailand || Decision || 5 || 3:00
|-  style="background:#cfc;"
| 2018-10-25|| Win ||align=left| Rodtang Jitmuangnon || Rajadamnern Stadium  || Bangkok, Thailand || Decision || 5 || 3:00 
|-  bgcolor="#cfc"
! style=background:white colspan=9 |
|-  style="background:#cfc;"
| 2018-09-13|| Win ||align=left| Mongkolchai Kwaitonggym  || Rajadamnern Stadium  || Bangkok, Thailand || TKO || 3 || 2:55
|-  style="background:#cfc;"
| 2018-08-09|| Win ||align=left| Rangkhao Wor.Sangprapai  || Rajadamnern Stadium  || Bangkok, Thailand || Decision || 5 || 3:00
|-  style="background:#cfc;"
| 2018-07-05|| Win ||align=left| Rangkhao Wor.Sangprapai  || Rajadamnern Stadium  || Bangkok, Thailand || Decision || 5 || 3:00
|-  style="background:#cfc;"
| 2018-06-07 || Win ||align=left| Petchdam Petchyindee Academy || Rajadamnern Stadium || Bangkok, Thailand || Decision || 5 || 3:00
|-  style="background:#fbb;"
| 2018-05-09 || Loss ||align=left| Petchdam Petchyindee Academy || Rajadamnern Stadium || Bangkok, Thailand || Decision || 5 || 3:00
|-  bgcolor="#cfc"
! style=background:white colspan=9 |
|-  style="background:#cfc;"
| 2018-03-15 || Win ||align=left| Chanasuek Kor Kampanath || Rajadamnern Stadium || Bangkok, Thailand || Decision || 5 || 3:00
|-  style="background:#cfc;"
| 2018-01-31 || Win ||align=left| Kiewpayak Jitmuangnon || Rajadamnern Stadium || Bangkok, Thailand || Decision || 5 || 3:00
|-  style="background:#cfc;"
| 2017-12-27 || Win ||align=left| Krasuk Phetjinda || Rajadamnern Stadium || Bangkok, Thailand || Decision || 5 || 3:00
|-  style="background:#cfc;"
| 2017-11-01 || Win ||align=left| Kengkla Por.Pekko  || Rajadamnern Stadium || Bangkok, Thailand || Decision || 5 || 3:00
|-  style="background:#cfc;"
| 2017 || Win ||align=left| Cristian Pastore  ||  || Thailand || Decision || 3 || 3:00
|-  style="background:#fbb;"
| 2017-08-04 || Loss ||align=left| Krasuk Phetjinda || True4U, Rangsit Stadium || Rangsit, Thailand || Decision || 5 || 3:00
|-
! style=background:white colspan=9 |
|-  style="background:#cfc;"
| 2017-06-05 || Win ||align=left| Kriangkrai PetchyindeeAcademy  || Rajadamnern Stadium || Bangkok, Thailand || Decision || 5 || 3:00
|-  style="background:#cfc;"
| 2017-05-04 || Win ||align=left| Kengkart Por.Pekko  || Wachirarattanawong Promotion || Thailand || Decision || 5 || 3:00
|-  style="background:#cfc;"
| 2017-03-22 || Win ||align=left| PhetBankhaek So.Sommai  || Rajadamnern Stadium || Thailand || Decision || 5 || 3:00
|-  style="background:#cfc;"
| 2017-02-10 || Win ||align=left| Phetkeng Or.Boonchuay || True4U,  Rangsit Stadium || Rangsit, Thailand || Decision || 5 || 3:00
|-  style="background:#cfc;"
| 2017-01-13 || Win ||align=left| Yodsenchai Sor.Sopit || True4U, Rangsit Stadium || Rangsit, Thailand || Decision || 5 || 3:00
|-  bgcolor="#cfc"
! style=background:white colspan=9 |
|-  style="background:#cfc;"
| 2016-12-09 || Win ||align=left| YodET Tede99 || Rangsit Stadium|| Rangsit, Thailand || KO || 4 ||
|-  style="background:#cfc;"
| 2016-09-30 || Win ||align=left| Phetnakin Worsangprapai || Rangsit Stadium|| Rangsit, Thailand || Decision || 5 || 3:00
|-  style="background:#cfc;"
| 2016-09-02 || Win ||align=left| Thanupetch Witsanukollakan || Rangsit Stadium|| Rangsit, Thailand || Decision || 5 || 3:00
|-  style="background:#fbb;"
| 2016-08-05 || Loss ||align=left| Pone Muanglavo || True4U,  Rangsit Stadium || Rangsit, Thailand || Decision || 5 || 3:00
|-  style="background:#cfc;"
| 2016-06-20 || Win ||align=left| Teptaksin Sor.Sonsing  || Rajadamnern Stadium || Bangkok, Thailand || Decision || 5 || 3:00
|-  style="background:#fbb;"
| 2016-05-14 || Loss ||align=left| Kompatak SinbiMuayThai || Rangsit Stadium || Rangsit, Thailand || Decision || 5 || 3:00
|-  style="background:#fbb;"
| 2016-04-16 || Loss ||align=left| Nattaphon Nacheukvittayakom  ||  || Rangsit, Thailand || Decision || 5 || 3:00
|-  style="background:#cfc;"
| 2016-02-27 || Win ||align=left| Kongtoranee Sor.Boongium  ||  || Kalasin Province, Thailand || Decision || 5 || 3:00
|-  style="background:#cfc;"
| 2016-02-19 || Win ||align=left| Phetchiangkwan Nayoksomdet  || Rajadamnern Stadium || Bangkok, Thailand || Decision || 5 || 3:00
|-  style="background:#cfc;"
| 2016-02-06 || Win ||align=left| Khunhan Sitthongsak  || Ransgsit Stadium || Thailand || Decision || 5 || 3:00
|-
! style=background:white colspan=9 |
|-  style="background:#cfc;"
| 2016-01-02 || Win ||align=left| Pawarit Somjitgym  ||  || Krabi, Thailand || Decision || 5 || 3:00
|-  style="background:#fbb;"
| 2015-12-03 || Loss||align=left| Jaroenpon Popthirathum  || Rajadamnern Stadium || Bangkok, Thailand || Decision || 5 || 3:00
|-  style="background:#fbb;"
| 2015-11-09 || Loss||align=left| Nongyot Sitjekan  || Rajadamnern Stadium || Bangkok, Thailand || Decision || 5 || 3:00
|-  style="background:#cfc;"
| 2015-10-02 || Win ||align=left| Yokmorakot Wor.Sangpapai  || Lumpinee Stadium || Bangkok, Thailand || Decision || 5 || 3:00
|-  style="background:#cfc;"
| 2015-09-09 || Win ||align=left| Yokmorakot Wor.Sangpapai  || Rajadamnern Stadium || Bangkok, Thailand || Decision || 5 || 3:00
|-  style="background:#fbb;"
| 2015-08-11 || Loss ||align=left| Wanchai Kiatmuu9 || Lumpinee Stadium || Bangkok, Thailand || Decision || 5 || 3:00
|-  style="background:#fbb;"
| 2015-07-14 || Loss ||align=left| Thanadet Thor.Pan 49  || Lumpinee Stadium || Bangkok, Thailand || Decision || 5 || 3:00
|-  style="background:#fbb;"
| 2015-05-21 || Loss ||align=left| Achanai PetchyindeeAcademy  || Rajadamnern Stadium || Bangkok, Thailand || Decision || 5 || 3:00
|-  style="background:#cfc;"
| 2015-03-25 || Win ||align=left| YodET Tede99  || Rajadamnern Stadium || Bangkok, Thailand || Decision || 5 || 3:00
|-  style="background:#cfc;"
| 2014-12-26 || Win ||align=left| Phanmongkol Sor.Thaviwat  || Lumpinee Stadium || Bangkok, Thailand || Decision || 5 || 3:00
|-  style="background:#cfc;"
| 2013-12-15 || Win ||align=left| Geng Kor Glomgliew  || Aswindam Stadium || Bangkok, Thailand || Decision || 5 || 3:00
|-  style="background:#cfc;"
| 2012-12-15 || Win ||align=left| Kongkriengkrai KoMapraoMuayThai || || Phuket, Thailand || Decision || 5 || 3:00
|-
! style=background:white colspan=9 |
|-
| colspan=9 | Legend:

References

Rungkit Wor.Sanprapai
2002 births
Living people
Rungkit Wor.Sanprapai